Carmel School is an I.C.S.E. board school for girls in Bhagalpur, Bihar, India. It is part of a branch of schools founded by Veronica of the Passion, established on June 23, 1958. It is one of the leading educational institutions in Bihar.

References 

Carmelite educational institutions
Catholic schools in India
Girls' schools in Bihar
Education in Bhagalpur district
Bhagalpur
Christian schools in Bihar
Educational institutions in India with year of establishment missing